Paul Green (born 16 February 1977) is a British former international taekwondo athlete, GB National Team player, coach of the GB National Squad, and current coach of the USAT Nationals Team.

Green was born in Manchester, England. After a successful trial and being selected for the GB National Team, he fought in the 2004 Athens Olympics. Green is now a USA Taekwondo National Team coach.

Green coached the 2012 and 2016 Olympic Gold and World Champion Gold 2015 and 2017.

References

1977 births
Living people
English male taekwondo practitioners
Taekwondo practitioners at the 2004 Summer Olympics
Olympic taekwondo practitioners of Great Britain
Martial arts trainers
European Taekwondo Championships medalists
World Taekwondo Championships medalists